David Graeme may refer to:
 David Graeme (1716–1797) Scottish soldier, diplomat and courtier, MP for Perthshire 1764–73
 David Graeme (died 1726) United Kingdom MP for Perthshire 1724–26

See also 
 Graeme (surname)